Miloš Bojanić (born 16 October 1950) is a Bosnian  pop-folk singer, well known in former Yugoslavia where he has maintained a popularity throughout his 30-year-career.

Personal life
Bojanić was born to a family of ethnic Bosnian Serbs in Bijeljina, SR Bosnia and Herzegovina, SFR Yugoslavia, and lived in Ruhotina, near Bijeljina. He moved to Serbia at a young age. He has homes in Novi Sad (where he lives), Belgrade, and on the Montenegrin littoral.

His sons, Bane and Mikica, are singers as well. Bane lives in Chicago.

Reality television

He has also appeared in the second season of Farma (Serbian TV series) in 2010 and he won the show, earning the prize of 100,000 euros.

Discography
Hej mladosti ej živote (1984)
Tako tako samo tako (1985)
Oba srca kucaju ko jedno (1986)
Zato što sam dobar bio (1986)
Bosno moja jabuko u cvetu (1987)
Otišo sam mlad a vraćam se sed (1988)
Stara sreća na ljubav me seća (1988)
Imala si sreće (1989)
Volim te (1990)
Preboleću (1992)
Izdala si ljubav (1993)
Dogodi se il ne dogodi (1994)
Zmija u njedrima (1995)
Digi digi daj (1996)
Pade sneg na Đurđevdan (1997)
Sanjam te (1998)
Prijatelj samoće (2000)
Gledam oči tvoje (2001)
Još su žive one godine (2002)
20 godina sa vama (2004)
Hajmo na noge (2006)

References

1950 births
Living people
People from Bijeljina
Yugoslav male singers
20th-century Serbian male singers
21st-century Serbian male singers
Serbian folk singers
Serbian turbo-folk singers
Grand Production artists
Serbs of Bosnia and Herzegovina